is a former Nippon Professional Baseball pitcher.

External links

 NPB.com

1977 births
Living people
People from Iyo, Ehime
Baseball people from Ehime Prefecture
Waseda University alumni
Japanese baseball players
Nippon Professional Baseball pitchers
Yakult Swallows players
Tokyo Yakult Swallows players
Hokkaido Nippon-Ham Fighters players
Yomiuri Giants players
Yokohama DeNA BayStars players